Norman Cohen (11 June 1936 in Dublin – 26 October 1983 in Van Nuys, California) was an Irish film director and producer, best known for directing two feature films based on television comedy programmes, Till Death Us Do Part (1969) and Dad's Army (1971). He was also a director of several of the Confessions of...  sex comedy series: Confessions of a Pop Performer (1975), Confessions of a Driving Instructor (1976) and Confessions from a Holiday Camp (1977).

In addition to those films, he also produced as well as directed the adaptation of Spike Milligan's Adolf Hitler: My Part in His Downfall (1973), and the comedy sequel Stand Up, Virgin Soldiers (1977). Cohen's first film production was The London Nobody Knows (1967) narrated by James Mason and his final film was Burning Rubber (1981).

He died after suffering a heart attack in 1983.

References

External links

1936 births
1983 deaths
Irish film directors
Irish film producers